Jun-sang also spelled Joon-sang, is a Korean masculine given name.

People with this name include:
Yoo Jun-sang (born 1969), South Korean actor

Fictional characters with this name include:
Kang Joon-sang, in 2012 South Korean television series Winter Sonata

See also
List of Korean given names

Korean masculine given names